The Ukrainian Orthodox Church, commonly referred to as the Ukrainian Orthodox Church of the Moscow Patriarchate (UOC-MP),  is an Eastern Orthodox church in Ukraine. It is a matter of dispute as to whether the Church is under the ecclesiastical jurisdiction of the Russian Orthodox Church or is autocephalic. Following the 2022 Russian invasion of Ukraine, the UOC-MP claimed that 'any provisions that at least somehow hinted at or indicated the connection with Moscow were excluded'; the Russian Orthodox Church, however, ignores this claim and continues to include UOC-MP clerics in various commissions or working groups. As of March 2023, only one case has been recorded of a priest not agreeing to this.

The church was officially formed in 1990 in place of Ukrainian Exarchate of the Russian Orthodox Church, which in 1966–1990 was led by Metropolitan Filaret, who is the longest serving primate of the Church.

The UOC-MP is one of the two major Eastern Orthodox ecclesiastical bodies in modern Ukraine, alongside the Orthodox Church of Ukraine (OCU). The latter was established at the Unification Council held under the auspices of the Ecumenical Patriarchate of Constantinople on 15 December 2018 and which council was not attended by the majority of the bishops of the UOC.  Since then, the Ecumenical Patriarchate of Constantinople disputes the claims by the Moscow Patriarchate of its ecclesiastical jurisdiction over the territory of Ukraine.

According to the Russian Orthodox Church, the Primate of the UOC-MP is the most senior permanent member of the ROC's Holy Synod and thus has a say in its decision-making in respect of the rest of the ROC throughout the world.

On May 27, 2022, the UOC-MP has removed all mentions of the Moscow Patriarchate from its statute due to Patriarch Kirill's support of the invasion of Ukraine. Prior to this decision, more than 400 parishes had left the Moscow Patriarchate as a consequence of the invasion. Despite the removal of direct mentions of the Russian Orthodox Church, the Charter of the Patriarch of Moscow and All Russia Alexy II the statute refers to declares the canonical dependence on the ROC. According to a Ukrainian theologian , the church have done these changes in order to avoid renaming in accordance with the Ukrainian law.

Despite the de facto annexation of Crimea by the Russian Federation in 2014, the eparchies of the UOC in Crimea continued to be administered by the UOC, until in June 2022 the Moscow Patriarchate decided to re-transfer Crimea from the Ukrainian Church of the Moscow Patriarchate.  The UOC continues to list the Crimean eparchies and has not recognized any change to its territorial boundaries based on decisions taken by the ROC.

Name
The Ukrainian Orthodox Church (MP) insists on its name being just the Ukrainian Orthodox Church, stating that it is the sole canonical body of Orthodox Christians in the country, a Ukrainian "local church".

It is also the name that it is registered under in the State Committee of Ukraine in Religious Affairs.

It is often referred to as the Ukrainian Orthodox Church (Moscow Patriarchate) or UOC (MP) in order to distinguish between the two rival churches contesting the name of the Ukrainian Orthodox Church.

Following the creation of the Orthodox Church of Ukraine, on December 20, 2018, the Ukrainian parliament voted to force the UOC-MP to rename itself in its mandatory state registration, its new name must have "the full name of the church to which it is subordinated". This was protested by UOC-MP adherents. On 11 December 2019 the Supreme Court of Ukraine allowed the Ukrainian Orthodox Church of the Moscow Patriarchate (UOC-MP) to retain its name. The UOC-MP had argued that their governing center is in Ukraine's capital, Kyiv, not in Russia's capital, Moscow, and therefore it should not be renamed.

History

Under the Ecumenical Patriarchate of Constantinople

Metropolises in Moscow, Lithuania and  Galicia
The Ukrainian Orthodox Church considers itself the sole descendant in modern Ukraine of the Metropolis of Kiev and all Rus' that was established in the 10th century following the baptism of Kievan Rus'. Due to the Mongol invasion of Rus' in the 13th century, the metropolitan seat was moved to Vladimir and later to Moscow. In the Kingdom of Galicia and Volhynia to the south-west, a separate metropolis was erected - the Metropolis of Halych. Similarly, in the north-west, another metropolis was erected at the behest of Algirdas, the Grand Duke of Lithuania  - the Metropolis of Lithuania.

Revival
In 1596, the Metropolitan of Kyiv, Galich and all Rus' Michael Rohoza accepted the Union of Brest transforming dioceses of the Ecumenical Patriarchate of Constantinople into the Ukrainian Greek Catholic Church under the Holy See's jurisdiction. In 1620, the Ecumenical Patriarchate of Constantinople Cyril Lucaris reestablished Orthodox dioceses for the Orthodox population of what was then the Polish–Lithuanian Commonwealth — under the Metropolitan of Kyiv, Galicia, and all Russia Job Boretsky as the Patriarchal Exarch.

Merger into the Moscow Patriarchate
Following the transfer of the Cossack Hetmanate under the sovereignty of the Tsardom of Russia in 1654, the Kyivan metropolis in 1686 was transferred by the Patriarch Dionysius IV under the jurisdiction of the Moscow Patriarchate, following the election of Gedeon Svyatopolk-Chetvertynsky as the Metropolitan of Kyiv, Galicia, and all Russia with the help of the Hetman of Zaporizhian Host Ivan Samoylovych. In late 2018, the Ecumenical Patriarchate of Constantinople indicated that information about that it transferred jurisdiction over Ukraine to the Moscow Patriarchate was inaccurate as Constantinople temporarily provided Moscow with stewardship over the Ukrainian church. The Russian Orthodox Church immediately rejected that statement and called for further discussion and revision of historical archives.

Soon, Gedeon gradually lost control of the dioceses which had been under the jurisdiction of the Metropolitan of Kyiv. In January 1688, Gedeon's title was changed by Moscow to the ″Metropolitan of Kyiv, Galich, and Little Russia″. Gedeon's successors were effectively mere diocesan bishops under the Moscow Patriarchate and later Russia's Most Holy Synod.

Before the Battle of Poltava, when Ivan Mazepa sided with Carl XII, the new Metropolitan Ioasaf along with bishops of Chernigov and Pereyaslav was summoned by Peter the Great to Glukhov where they were ordered to declare an anathema onto Mazepa. After the battle of Poltava, in 1709 Metropolitan Ioasaf was exiled to Tver and in 1710 a church censorship was introduced to the Kyiv metropolia. In 1718 Metropolitan Ioasaf was arrested and dispatched to Saint Petersburg for interrogation where he died.

From 1718 to 1722, the Metropolitan See in Kyiv was vacant and ruled by the Kyiv Spiritual Consistory (under the authority of the Most Holy Synod); in 1722 it was occupied by Archbishop Varlaam.

Synodal period
In 1730, Archbishop Varlaam with all members of the Kyiv Spiritual Consistory were put on trial by the Privy Chancellery. After being convicted, Varlaam as a simple monk was exiled to the Kirillo-Belozersky Monastery in Vologda region where he served a sentence of imprisonment of 10 years. After the death of the Russian Empress Anna in 1740, Varlaam was allowed to return and recovered all his Archiereus titles. He however refused to accept back those titles and, after asked to be left in peace, moved to the Tikhvin Assumption Monastery. In 1750 Varlaam accepted the Great Schema under the name of Vasili and soon died in 1751.

In 1743, the title of Metropolitan was re-instated for Archbishop Raphael Zaborovsky.

On 2 April 1767, the Empress of Russia Catherine the Great issued an edict stripping the title of the Kyivan Metropolitan of the style "and all Little Russia".

Fall of monarchy in Russia and Exarchate

Metropolitan Vladimir Bogoyavlensky chaired the All-Ukrainian Church Council that took a break between its sessions on 18 January 1918 and was to be resumed in May 1918. On 23–24 January 1918, the Red Guards of Reingold Berzin occupied Kyiv (see Ukrainian–Soviet War). In the evening of 25 January 1918, Metropolitan Vladimir was found dead between walls of the Old Pechersk Fortress beyond the Gates of All Saints, having been killed by unknown people.

In May 1918, the Metropolitan of Kyiv and Galich Antony Khrapovitsky was appointed to the Kyiv eparchy, a former candidate to become the Patriarch of Moscow at the Russian Local Council of 1917 and losing it to the Patriarch Tikhon. In July 1918 Metropolitan Antony became the head of the All-Ukrainian Church Council. Eventually he sided with the Russian White movement supporting the Denikin's forces of South Russia, while keeping the title of Metropolitan of Kyiv and Halych. After the defeat of the Whites and the exile of Antony, in 1919-21 the metropolitan seat was temporarily held by the bishop of Cherkasy Nazariy (also the native of Kazan). After the arrest of Nazariy by the Soviet authorities in 1921, the seat was provisionally held by the bishop of Grodno and newly elected Exarch of Ukraine Mikhail, a member of the Russian Black Hundreds nationalistic movement. After his arrest in 1923, the Kyiv eparchy was provisionally headed by various bishops of neighboring eparchies until 1927. After his return in 1927 Mikhail became the Metropolitan of Kyiv and Exarch of Ukraine until his death in 1929.

In 1945, after the integration of Zakarpattia Oblast into the USSR, eastern parts of the Eparchy of Mukačevo and Prešov were transferred from the supreme jurisdiction of the Serbian Orthodox Church to the jurisdiction of the Exarchate of Russian Orthodox Church in Ukraine, and a new Eparchy of Mukachevo and Uzhgorod was formed.

Dissolution of the Soviet Union and self rule

On 28 October 1990, the Moscow Patriarchate granted the Ukrainian Exarchate a status of a self–governing church under the jurisdiction of the ROC (but not the full autonomy as is understood in the ROC legal terminology). However, the Ukrainian branch remained crucial to the Moscow Patriarchate, because of historical and traditional roots in Kyiv and Ukraine, and because nearly a third of the Moscow Patriarchate's 36,000 congregations were in Ukraine.

Metropolitan Vladimir (Sabodan), who succeeded Filaret (Denysenko), was enthroned in 1992 as the Primate of the UOC under the title Metropolitan of Kyiv and all Ukraine, with the official residency in the Kyiv Pechersk Lavra, which also houses all of the Church's administration.

The UOC-MP, prior to 2019, was believed to be the largest religious body in Ukraine with the greatest number of parish churches and communities counting up to half of the total in Ukraine and totaling over 10,000. The UOC also claimed to have up to 75 percent of the Ukrainian population. Independent surveys showed significant variance. According to Stratfor, in 2008, more than 50 percent of Ukrainian population belonged to the Ukrainian Orthodox Church under the Moscow Patriarch. Razumkov Centre survey results, however, tended to show greater adherence to the rival Ukrainian Orthodox Church of the Kyivan Patriarchate.

Many Orthodox Ukrainians do not clearly identify with a particular Orthodox jurisdiction and, sometimes, are even unaware of the affiliation of the parish they attend as well as of the controversy itself, which indicates the difficulty of using survey numbers as an indicator of a relative strength of the church. Additionally, the geographical factor plays a major role in the number of adherents, as the Ukrainian population tends to be more churchgoing in the western part of the country rather than in the UOC-MP's heartland in southern and eastern Ukraine. Politically, many in Ukraine see the UOC-MP as merely a puppet of the ROC and consequently a geopolitical tool of Russia, which have stridently opposed the consolidation and recognition of the independent OCU.

Russo-Ukrainian War and eventual cutting ties with the ROC

Since 2014 the church has come under attack for perceived anti-Ukrainian and pro-Russian actions by its clergymen. On 14 September 2015 it urged the pro-Russian separatists to lay down their arms and take advantage of the amnesty promised to them in the Minsk II agreement. Ukraine passed laws which the Moscow Patriarchate interpreted as discriminatory in 2017.

From 2014 until 2018 around 60 Moscow Patriarchate parishes switched to the Kyivan Patriarchate in transfers the leadership of the Moscow patriarchate says were illegal. According to the Razumkov Center, among the 27.8 million Ukrainian members of Orthodox churches, allegiance to the Kyiv Patriarchate grew from 12 percent in 2000, to 25 percent in 2016—and much of the growth came from believers who previously did not associate with either patriarchate. In April 2018 Moscow patriarchate had 12,300 parishes and the Kyivan Patriarchate 5,100 parishes.

By decision of the Russian Orthodox Church Bishops’ Council (November 29-December 2, 2017), a separate chapter of the ROC Statute was singled out to confirm the status of UOC with the following provisions:
The Ukrainian Orthodox Church is granted independence and self-governance according to the Resolution of the Bishops’ Council of the Russian Orthodox Church which took place on October 25–27, 1990.
The Ukrainian Orthodox Church is an independent and self-governed Church with broad autonomy rights.
In her life and work the Ukrainian Orthodox Church is guided by the Resolution of the 1990 Bishops’ Council of the Russian Orthodox Church on the Ukrainian Orthodox Church, the 1990 Deed of the Patriarch of Moscow and All Russia and the Statute on the governance of the Ukrainian Orthodox Church.

In December 2017, the Security Service of Ukraine published classified documents revealing that the NKGB of the USSR and its units in the Union and autonomous republics, territories and regions were engaged in the selection of candidates for participation in the 1945 council that elected Patriarch Alexy I of Moscow from the representatives of the clergy and the laity. This included "persons who have religious authority among the clergy and believers, and at the same time checked for civic or patriotic work". A letter sent in September 1944 and signed by the head of the 2nd Directorate of the NKGB of the USSR Fedotov and the head of the Fifth Division 2nd Directorate of Karpov stated that "it is important to ensure that the number of nominated candidates is dominated by the agents of the NKGB, capable of holding the line that we need at the Council."

On 13 December 2018 a priest of the church, Volodymyr Maretsky, was sentenced in absentia to 6 years of imprisonment for hindering the Armed Forces of Ukraine in 2014 during the Russo-Ukrainian War. In November–December 2018, Security Service of Ukraine (SBU) carries out raids across the country targeting the UOC (MP) churches and priests.

In the week following the creation of the Orthodox Church of Ukraine on 15 December 2018, several parishes announced they would leave the UOC (MP) and join the new church.

On 20 December 2018, the Verkhovna Rada (Ukraine's national parliament) passed a legislation to change the UOC-MP's registered name. Ukrainian deputy  described the law as stipulating if "the state is recognized as the aggressor state, the church whose administration is based in the aggressor state must have in its title the full name of the church to which it is subordinate". The Russian Orthodox Church, which the UOC-MP is part of, is based in Russia, which is considered by Ukraine as an aggressor state following the 2014 Russian military intervention in Ukraine. The law also gave it "no right to be represented in military units on the front line". On 11 December 2019 the Supreme Court of Ukraine allowed the Ukrainian Orthodox Church of the Moscow Patriarchate (UOC-MP) to retain its name.

The January 2019 establishment of the Orthodox Church of Ukraine (OCU) by Patriarch Bartholomew I of Constantinople, joined two other churches: the Ukrainian Orthodox Church – Kyiv Patriarchate (UOC-KP), and the Ukrainian Autocephalous Orthodox Church (UAOC), along with two bishops who formerly belonged to the UOC-MP.  The remaining UOC-MP hierarchy continued to dismiss Patriarch Bartholomew's actions in Ukraine and remained loyal to the UOC-MP, while the church retained the vast majority of its parishes.  A May 2019 report by the European Council on Foreign Relations noted that the Moscow Patriarchate claimed 11,000 churches in Ukraine, while the new OCU claimed 7,000.

On 24 February 2022, Metropolitan Onufriy said the Russian invasion of Ukraine "is a repetition of the sin of Cain, who killed his own brother out of envy. Such a war has no justification either from God or from people." In April 2022, after the Russian invasion, many UOC-MP parishes signaled their intention to switch allegiance to the Orthodox Church of Ukraine.  The attitude and stance of Patriarch Kirill of Moscow to the war is one of the oft quoted reasons. On May 12, the synod of the UOC-MP met for the first time since the start of the war and issued a statement of support for Ukraine's armed forces, while condemning the Russian invasion.

On 27 May 2022, the Ukrainian Orthodox Church formally cut ties and declared independence from the Russian Orthodox Church. In an announcement on Telegram, Archpriest Nikolai Danilevich (head of the UOC's Department of External Church Relations) stated:The UOC disassociated itself from the Moscow Patriarchate and confirmed its independent status, and made appropriate changes to its statutes.

All references to the connection of the UOC with the Russian Orthodox Church have been removed from the statutes. In fact, in its content, the UOC statutes are now those of an autocephalous Church.

On 29 May 2022, Metropolitan Onufriy did not mention Patriarch Kirill during the liturgy as someone who had authority over him (like before), instead he commemorated all heads of churches, similar to primatial divine liturgies. Onufriy also did not commemorate the Ecumenical Patriarch Bartholomew I of Constantinople, Patriarch Theodoros II of Alexandria, Archbishop Ieronymos II of Athens (Greece), and Archbishop Chrysostomos II of Cyprus - indicating that communion is still interrupted between them.

In June 2022 the Moscow Patriarchate decided to re-transfer Crimea from the Ukrainian Church of the Moscow Patriarchate by creating the Metropolitanate of Crimea. Since the 2014 Russian annexation of Crimea the Ukrainian Orthodox Church (Moscow Patriarchate) had kept control of its eparchies in Crimea.  The UOC continues to list the Crimean eparchies and has not recognized any change to its territorial boundaries based on decisions taken by the ROC.

By early November 2022 the Security Service of Ukraine had exposed 33 alleged "agents" and alleged unofficial artillery observers among the UOC priests and clergy. It had opened 23 criminal proceedings.

On 2 December 2022 Ukrainian President Volodymyr Zelenskyy entered a bill to the Verkhovna Rada that would officially ban all activities of the UOC in Ukraine. On the same day, the Kyiv Pechersk Lavra monastery was claimed to be extrajudicially transferred from the UOC to the Orthodox Church of Ukraine (OCU), but the UOC refuted this.

On 14 December 2022 Ukraine handed over a UOC priest to Russia in a prisoner exchange. The priest had been sentenced for treason in Ukraine.

On 27 December 2022 the Constitutional Court of Ukraine recognized as in accordance with the Constitution of Ukraine the 20 December 2018 law to change the UOC-MP's registered name to indicate affiliation with Russia.

Although the UOC-MP in a press conference on 31 December 2022 again stated that ‘any provisions that at least somehow hinted at or indicated the connection with Moscow were excluded’, the Russian Orthodox Church ignored this and continued to include UOC-MP clerics in various commissions or working groups despite these individuals not agreeing to this. For instances: late December 2022 UOC-MP Archpriest Volodymyr Savelyev was against his knowing included in the ROC Publishing Council for the period 2023-2026, after finding this out he demanded to be expelled from the council (while simultaneously condemning "the aggressive war waged by Russia against my homeland — Ukraine").

In January 2023 13 representatives of the UOC-MP were deprived of their Ukrainian citizenship, including two metropolitans. In February 2023 five UOC-MP (either) metropolitans, archbishops and bishops were deprived of their Ukrainian citizenship (Metropolitan Feodosiy Platon was banned from entering Ukraine).

The religious buildings and other property of the Kyiv Pechersk Lavra  (although state property) have been used for decades by the UOC-MP free of charge. On 10 March 2023, the Reserve announced that the 2013 agreement on the free use of churches by the religious organisation would be terminated and the UOC-MP was ordered to leave the territory by 29 March. The UOC-MP answered back that there were no legal grounds for the eviction and called it "a whim of officials from the Ministry of Culture." On 17 March 2023 the press secretary for Russian President Vladimir Putin Dmitry Peskov stated that the decision of the Ukrainian authorities not to extend this lease to representatives of the UOC-MP "confirms the correctness" of the (24 Februari 2022) Russian invasion of Ukraine.

Administrative divisions

In October 2014 the Russian Orthodox Church in Ukraine was subdivided into 53 eparchies (dioceses) led by bishops. Also there were 25 vicars (suffragan bishops).

In 2008 the Church had 42 eparchies, with 58 bishops (eparchial - 42; vicar - 12; retired - 4; with them being classified as: metropolitans - 10; archbishops - 21; or bishops - 26). There were also 8,516 priests, and 443 deacons.

Notwithstanding the 2014 Russian annexation of Crimea the Ukrainian Orthodox Church (Moscow Patriarchate) kept control of its eparchies in Crimea until June 2022. In January 2019 the head of the Information and Educational Department of the UOC-MP, Archbishop Clement, stated that "from the point of view of the church canon and the church system, Crimea is Ukrainian territory."

In June 2022 the Moscow Patriarchate decided to re-transfer Crimea from the Ukrainian Church of the Moscow Patriarchate. They did this by creating the Metropolitanate of Crimea.  The UOC continues to list the Crimean eparchies and has not recognized any change to its territorial boundaries based on decisions taken by the ROC.

List of Primates

Metropolitan of Kyiv, Galich, and all Little Russia

 Metropolitan Gedeon Svyatopolk-Chetvertynsky 1685–1690, the first Metropolitan of Kyiv of the Russian Orthodox Church, until 1688 was titled as the Metropolitan of Kyiv, Galicia, and all Ruthenia
 Metropolitan Varlaam 1690–1707
 Metropolitan Ioasaph 1707–1718
none 1718–1722
 Archbishop Varlaam 1722–1730
 Metropolitan Raphael 1731–1747, until 1743 as Archbishop
 Metropolitan Timothy 1748–1757
 Metropolitan Arseniy 1757–1770, in 1767 Metropolitan Arseniy became Metropolitan of Kyiv and Halych

Note: in 1770 the office's jurisdiction was reduced to a diocese's administration as Metropolitan of Kyiv and Galicia. The autonomy was liquidated and the church was merged to the Russian Orthodox Church.

Exarch of Ukraine
Due to emigration of Metropolitan Antony in 1919, until World War II Kyiv eparchy was often administered by provisional bishops. Also because of political situation in Ukraine, the Russian Orthodox Church introduced a new title in its history as the Exarch of Ukraine that until 1941 was not necessary associated with the title of Metropolitan of Kyiv and Halych.

 Metropolitan Mikhail (Yermakov) 1921–1929 (Bishop of Grodno and Brest, 1905–1921; Archbishop of Tobolsk, 1925; and Metropolitan of Kyiv, 1927–1929)
 Metropolitan Konstantin (Dyakov) 1929–1937 (Metropolitan of Kharkiv and Okhtyrka, 1927–1934 and Metropolitan of Kyiv 1934–1937)
none 1937–1941, exarch was not appointed

Metropolitan of Volyn and Lutsk, Exarch of West Ukraine and Belarus
On canonical territory of the Polish Orthodox Church of the recently annexed territories of western Ukraine and western Belarus
 Metropolitan Nicholas (Yarushevich) 1940–1941

Metropolitan of Kyiv and Halych, Exarch of Ukraine

 Metropolitan Nicholas (Yarushevich) 1941–1944
 During World War II, on the territories of Ukraine occupied by Nazi Germany, Metropolitan Aleksiy organized the Ukrainian Autonomous Orthodox Church that considered itself part of the Russian Orthodox Church.
 Metropolitan John (Sokolov) 1944–1964
 Metropolitan Joasaph (Leliukhin) 1964–1966
 Metropolitan Filaret (Denysenko) 1966–1990

Metropolitan of Kyiv and all Ukraine

Metropolitan Filaret (Denysenko) 1990–1992
Metropolitan Volodymyr (Sabodan) 1992–2014
Metropolitan Onuphrius (Berezovsky) 2014–Present

See also 

Autocephaly of the Orthodox Church of Ukraine
2018 Moscow–Constantinople schism
List of monasteries of the Ukrainian Orthodox Church (Moscow Patriarchate)
Transition of church communities to OCU

Notelist

References

Sources 

Tomos for Ukraine: rocking the Moscow foundation
Russian Orthodox Church severs ties with Ecumenical Patriarchate

External links 

 
Ukrainian Orthodox church bodies
Eastern Orthodox Church bodies in Europe
Self-governed churches of the Russian Orthodox Church
1990 establishments in Ukraine
Christian organizations established in 1990